The Turning Wheel is the third studio album by American experimental pop artist Spellling, released on June 25, 2021, by Sacred Bones Records. The album received generally positive reviews from music critics.

Composition 
The Turning Wheel has been noted for Spellling's dropping her earlier dark wave and gothic sounds and expanding her progressive pop terrain.

For instance, album opener "Little Deer" pulls from jazz pop and "plush" 1960s lounge pop, while "Emperor with an Egg" takes on chamber pop.

The album itself is divided into two parts, subtitled Above and Below respectively. Above begins with "Little Deer" and ends with "Emperor with an Egg", while Below begins with "Boys at School" and ends with "Revolution", as they are separated in the album's liner notes.

Critical reception

The Turning Wheel was met with resounding acclaim upon release. At Metacritic, which assigns a normalized rating out of 100 to reviews from professional publications, the release received an average score of 79, based on nine reviews, indicating "generally favorable reviews". Aggregator AnyDecentMusic? gave the album a 7.5 out of 10, based on their assessment of the critical consensus.

The album also garnered attention by being one of the few albums to receive a 10 rating from Anthony Fantano, via the online music outlet The Needle Drop.

Track listing
All songs written by Spellling.

Above
"Little Deer" – 5:39
"Always" – 5:14
"Turning Wheel" – 3:33
"The Future" – 3:27
"Awaken" – 4:31
"Emperor with an Egg" – 3:09

Below
"Boys at School" – 7:28
"Legacy" – 3:51
"Queen of Wands" – 5:21
"Magic Act" – 5:40
"Revolution" – 5:59
"Sweet Talk" – 3:33

Personnel
Credits adapted from Tidal.

Musicians

 Noor Al-Samarrai – choir
 Rita Andrade – viola
 Monica Benson – flugelhorn, trumpet
 Calliope Brass Quintet – brass
 Ted Case – string arrangements
 Jennifer Hinkle – bass trombone
 Donia Jarrar – piano
 Milo Jimenez – acoustic guitar
 Nick Marchione – brass arrangement
 Sara Mayo – trombone
 Jinty McTavish – violin
 Dharma Mooney – choir
 Macgregor Munson – banjo
 Brijean Murphy – conga drum
 Erin Paul – horn
 Lidia Rodriguez – baritone saxophone
 Javier Santiago – piano
 Rebecca Steinberg – flugelhorn, trumpet
 Sabrina Tabby – violin
 Ezra Teshome – choir
 Carolyn Walter – bassoon, clarinet, bass clarinet
 Del Sol Quartet – strings

Technical

 Spellling – producer
 Drew Vandenberg – additional production, mixing
 Adrian Morgan – mastering
 Jonny Esser – mastering
 Mike Johnson – mastering
 Aleks Ozolins – engineer
 John Finkbeiner – engineer

References

External links
 The Turning Wheel at Bandcamp

2021 albums
Experimental pop albums
Sacred Bones Records albums
Kickstarter-funded albums